The 2011–12 season (officially known as Liga de Plata) will be El Salvador's Segunda División de Fútbol Salvadoreño The season will be split into two championships Apertura 2011 and Clausura 2012. The champions of the Apertura and Clausura play the direct promotion playoff every year. The winner of that series ascends to Primera División de Fútbol de El Salvador.

Promotion and relegation 2011–2012 season
Teams promoted to Primera División de Fútbol Profesional - Apertura 2011
 Juventud Independiente

Teams relegated to Segunda División de Fútbol Salvadoreño  - Apertura 2011
 Atlético Balboa

Teams relegated to Tercera División de Fútbol Profesional - Apertura 2011
 Liberal I.R.
 Alacranes Del Norte (stripped of their license after failure of payment to the league)

Teams promoted from Tercera Division De Fútbol Profesional - Apertura 2011
 Isidro Metapán C
 La Asunción

Teams that failed to register for the - Apertura 2011
 Vendaval
 Atlético Balboa

Teams 

The league currently consists of the following 22 teams:

Apertura 2011

Personnel and sponsoring

Overall table

Group standings

Grupo Centro Occidente

Grupo Centro Oriente

Final phase

Quarterfinals

First leg

Second leg

Semi-finals

First leg

Second leg

Finals

Individual awards

Clausura 2012

Personnel and sponsoring

Overall table

Group standings

Grupo Centro Occidente

Grupo Centro Oriente

Final phase

Quarterfinals

First leg

Second leg

Brasilia won 1-0 on aggregate

Santa Tecla won 4-2 on aggregate

Chalatenango won 3-1 on aggregate.

1-1 on aggregate. Platense won 5-4 on penalties.

Semi-finals

First leg

Second leg

Brasilia won 5-0 on aggregate.

Santa Tecla won 3-0 on aggregate.

Finals

Individual awards

Aggregate season

Promotion Playoffs

Segunda División de Fútbol Salvadoreño seasons
2011–12 in Salvadoran football
EL Sal